The Europe/Africa Zone was one of three zones of regional competition in the 2009 Fed Cup.

Group I
Venue: Coral Tennis Club, Tallinn, Estonia (indoor hard)
Date: 4–7 February

The fifteen teams were divided into three pools of four teams and one pool of three. The four pool winners took part in play-offs to determine the two nations advancing to the World Group II play-offs. The nations finishing last in their pools took part in play-offs, with the two losing nations being relegated to Group II in 2010.

Pools

Play-offs

  and  advanced to the 2009 World Group II play-offs.

Group II
Venue: Attaleya Shine Tennis Club, Antalya, Turkey (outdoor hard)
Date: 21–25 April

The six teams were divided into two pool of three teams each. The winner of each pool played the runner-up of the other pool to determine which two nations will be promoted to Group I in 2010. The bottom nation in each pool will be relegated to Europe/Africa Zone Group III in 2010.

Pools

Play-offs 

  and  advanced to Group I for 2010.

Group III
Venue: Marsa Sports Club, Marsa, Malta (outdoor hard)
Date: 21–25 April

The eleven teams were divided into one pool of five teams and one pool of six. The top two teams of each pool progressed to Group II for 2010.

Pools 

  and  advanced to Group II for 2010. 

See also
Fed Cup structure

References

 Fed Cup Result, 2009 Europe/Africa Group I
 Fed Cup Result, 2009 Europe/Africa Group II
 Fed Cup Result, 2009 Europe/Africa Group III

External links
 Fed Cup website

 
Europe Africa
Sport in Antalya
21st century in Antalya
Tennis tournaments in Turkey
Sports competitions in Tallinn
Tennis tournaments in Estonia
Tennis tournaments in Malta
2009 in Turkish tennis
2009 in Estonian sport
2009 in Maltese sport
February 2009 sports events in Europe
April 2009 sports events
April 2009 sports events in Europe
21st century in Tallinn